Dilek Sabanci is the Turkish chairperson and CEO of Vista Tourism and Travel, a firm that she founded in 1989. She is an heir to the family fortune, being the daughter of the Turkish entrepreneur Sakıp Sabancı who formed the second largest industrial and financial conglomerate in the country, Sabancı Holding. According to the latest profile on Forbes, she is worth upwards of £1 billion.

Life and career

Dilek has two bachelor's degrees from Reinhardt University and Fisher College. Dilek established Vista Tourism and Travel with her father in 1989 and has evolved the company to one of the largest travel agencies in Turkey. She also serves as a board member of the family’s Hacı Ömer Sabancı Foundation, a philanthropic organisation involved in education and health.

Dilek is disabled and devotes much of her time to helping mentally and physically impaired people. Sabanci is also active in a number of charitable groups as the vice president of Turkish Sports Federation for the Mentally Handicapped, chair of board of directors of Turkish Special Olympics, and an active member in Foundation for Children with Leukemia and Kanlica Lions and Rotary Clubs.

Supporting various social, cultural and sports activities every year, Sabanci has funded several facilities, including “Dilek Sabanci Anatolian Vocational Trade School”, “Besiktas Municipality Dilek Sabanci Park”, “Dilek Sabanci Antalya Sports Hall”, “Dilek Sabanci Gulen Yuzler Vocational Rehabilitation and Business Centre”, “Konya Selcuk University Dilek Sabanci Conservatory” as well as “Dilek Sabanci Art Gallery” in Mardin.

References

1964 births
Living people
Fisher College alumni
Reinhardt University alumni
Turkish businesspeople
Turkish chief executives